List of Canadian ambassadors to Mexico.

External links 
 Foreign Affairs Canada - List of Canadian ambassadors to Mexico

Mexico
 
Canada